Raquel Pega Infante (born 19 September 1990) is a Portuguese professional footballer who plays as either a defender or midfielder for Spanish Primera División club EdF Logroño and the Portugal women's national team.

Club career
Infante played for Ponte Frielas and 1º Dezembro, before embarking on a peripatetic career with clubs in Spain, Italy, Finland and France.

In December 2018, Infante was announced as an S.L. Benfica player. She had begun the season with EDF Logroño in Spain but failed to make any appearances due to recovering from surgery.

International career
Infante was named by coach Francisco Neto in the 23-player Portugal national team for UEFA Women's Euro 2017.

Honours
Benfica
 Campeonato Nacional II Divisão: 2018–19
 Supertaça de Portugal: 2019

References

External links
 
 
 
 Profile at AupaAthletic 

1990 births
Living people
Footballers from Lisbon
Portuguese women's footballers
Portugal women's international footballers
Women's association football defenders
Portuguese expatriate women's footballers
Expatriate women's footballers in Spain
Expatriate women's footballers in Italy
Expatriate women's footballers in Finland
Expatriate women's footballers in France
Portuguese expatriate sportspeople in Spain
Portuguese expatriate sportspeople in Italy
Portuguese expatriate sportspeople in Finland
Portuguese expatriate sportspeople in France
Primera División (women) players
UE L'Estartit players
Levante UD Femenino players
Kansallinen Liiga players
Åland United players
Serie A (women's football) players
Rodez AF (women) players
Division 1 Féminine players
S.L. Benfica (women) footballers
Campeonato Nacional de Futebol Feminino players
C.F. Benfica (women) footballers
S.U. 1º Dezembro (women) players
CD Badajoz Femenino players
UEFA Women's Euro 2017 players